"Dragostea Din Tei" (official English title: "Words of Love", also informally known as "Maya Hi" and "Numa Numa") is a song by Moldovan pop group O-Zone, released as the second single from their third studio album, DiscO-Zone (2004). The song's title is Romanian for "Love from the linden tree". The song received positive reviews from critics and shot to number one on the Eurochart Hot 100 Singles, where it remained for 12 weeks between June and early September 2004. It topped the single charts in France, Germany, and Austria for over three months, reached number 3 in the United Kingdom and number 72 on the US Pop 100. The song became the fourth best-selling single of the 21st century in France, with 1.17 million units sold.

The original song was popularised in the United States via the viral video "Numa Numa" in which vlogger Gary Brolsma dances to the song. A remix entitled "Numa Numa 2" by Dan Balan (from O-Zone) featuring Marley Waters was posted on YouTube on 12 September 2018 (not to be confused with a 2006 video by Brolsma of the same name but which is unrelated to "Dragostea Din Tei").

Overall, the single reached number one in over 27 countries and went on to sell upwards of 12 million copies worldwide, making it one of the best-selling singles of all time.

O-Zone version

Lyrics

The best-known lyrics are the repeated line "nu mă, nu mă iei" from the chorus, hence the name "Numa Numa song". "Nu mă, nu mă iei" (literally "you don't, you don't take me") is typically translated as "you just won't take me". The full chorus, which also includes the title of the song, runs:

which translates as:

(You) want to leave but don't want to take me,
Don't want to take me, don't want, don't want to take me
Your face and the love from the linden trees,
Remind me of your eyes.

Background and writing
The song was written and composed by Dan Bălan, and the original version was sung by Bălan, Arsenie Todiraș, and Radu Sârbu. The single was first released in 2003 in Romania, where the group lived and produced at that time, and in the spring of 2004 in most other European countries, where it became a summer hit. As late as 2006, the song was still in the lower reaches of some Eastern European singles charts.

O-Zone's version was the most popular across Europe, with the exception of Italy, where it was only known by disco-goers. A cover version of the song performed by Romanian singer Haiducii, who released the song in Europe around the same time, was more popular in Italy and Sweden, where it topped the singles charts.

"Dragostea Din Tei" has also inspired a number of parody videos distributed over the Internet, most notably Gary Brolsma's popular "Numa Numa Dance" video in 2004, so named because of the line "nu mă nu mă iei". The "Numa Numa Dance", which first appeared on the flash site Newgrounds, has become so notable that it has sparked numerous parodies of the video itself in the United States over the years since 2004.

English-language version
The US, UK, and Australian release of DiscO-Zone features an English version of the song performed by Dan Bălan and Lucas Prata. This version focuses on the "It's me, Picasso" lyric from the original to provide a theme of an artist who has lost his muse. Bălan and Prata performed the English recording of "Dragostea Din Tei" entitled "Ma Ya Hi" on The Today Show on 22 February 2005. Unlike the original recording, however, this version was not as successful, charting at 72 on the Billboard Pop 100.

Track listings
CD single
 "Dragostea Din Tei" (original Romanian version) – 3:33
 "Dragostea Din Tei" (DJ Ross Radio RMX) – 4:15

CD maxi single
 "Dragostea Din Tei" (original Romanian version) – 3:33
 "Dragostea Din Tei" (DJ Ross Radio RMX) – 4:15
 "Dragostea Din Tei" (DJ Ross Extended RMX) – 6:22
 "Dragostea Din Tei" (original Italian version) – 3:35
 "Dragostea Din Tei" (Unu' in the Dub Mix) – 3:39

Charts

Weekly charts

Year-end charts

Decade-end charts

Certifications and sales

Haiducii version

A cover version by Italian-Romanian singer Haiducii, with a strong dance impact, was charted at the same time as the original version by O-Zone. Although it had great success in many countries, including Sweden, Austria, and Italy, where it topped the chart, it was less successful than O-Zone's version.

Haiducii was later sued by O-Zone for copyright infringement since she had neither obtained permission from O-Zone to record the single nor given due credit to Dan Bălan for being the original writer of the song. This resulted in Haiducii paying fees for copyright infringement.

Track listings
CD single
 "Dragostea din tei" (original mix) – 3:35
 "Dragostea din tei" (Haiducii vs. Gabry Ponte radio version) – 3:42
 "Dragostea din tei" (DJ Ross 4 the radio RMX) – 4:15
 "Dragostea din tei" (Haiducii vs. Gabry Ponte extended version) – 6:30
 "Dragostea din tei" (DJ Ross 4 The Club RMX) – 6:22

CD maxi single
 "Dragostea din tei" (original mix) – 3:33
 "Dragostea din tei" (Haiducii vs Gabry Ponte radio version) – 3:43
 "Dragostea din tei" (DJ Ross 4 Radio Mix) – 4:16
 "Dragostea din tei" (Haiducii vs Gabry Ponte extended version) – 6:32
 "Dragostea din tei" (DJ Ross 4 club mix) – 6:20

Charts

Weekly charts

Year-end charts

Decade-end charts

Certifications

Charting in other versions

Cover versions and derivative productions

Americas
 A popular video named "Numa Numa", originally posted on entertainment website Newgrounds, features Gary Brolsma performing a lip-sync to the song while dancing. The video soon spread to other social media sites such as YouTube and went viral. Brolsma was named "#1 Internet Celebrity" on VH1's 40 Greatest Internet Superstars, which aired on 23 March 2007.
 American rapper T.I. sampled the song in his 2008 single "Live Your Life", which features Rihanna.
 In 2011, Hank Azaria covered the song as the character The Mighty Sven for the animated film Happy Feet Two.
 Brazilian singer Latino released "Festa no Apê" in 2004, which has become his signature song ever since. The lyrics are completely different, but the melody is the same as "Dragostea Din Tei".

Europe
 The Hungarian comedy-music group Irigy Hónaljmirigy made a parody called "Numerakirály", which is still considered one of their most popular parodies.
 A spoof named "Zorzon" was released by the Romanian metal band Trooper as a bonus track on one of their albums.
 In Spain, the comedy duo Los Morancos de Triana, formed by brothers Jorge and Cesar Cadaval, made a spoof version called "Marica tú" ("Queer You" in English), also known as "Pluma gay" ("Gay Feather"). It became a major radio hit in many countries in Latin America, particularly in Mexico, Chile, Colombia, Argentina, Venezuela, and Puerto Rico. In some of these countries, the song is more well-known than the original, whereby the original "Dragostea Din Tei" is often confused with this parody in Latin America, leading to controversy over a Chicken Little trailer in which the titular character dances to "Dragostea Din Tei". The comedy duo occasionally addresses LGBT issues in their comedy routines. In this case, the comedy duo replaced the original lyrics with audaciously pro-gay lyrics in Spanish, more or less preserving the original Romanian rhyme in parts (an intentional sort of mondegreen or soramimi), and thereby transformed the song into an international gay anthem. The music video features a man who, after singing for a while, unleashes a stereotypical gay party, with smoke, lights, feathers, and male strippers while advising the listener to come out of the closet. Dominican merengue singer Mala Fe recorded a merengue version of the song.
 Hungarian Minisztár released a "Dragostea Din Tei" music video in 2005.
 Finnish singer Frederik released a tongue-in-cheek cover called "Kumimies" in 2005, in which an unsavory suitor is trying to reach "little Maija", but mistakenly calls him (her father) instead.
 Portuguese Onda Choc released "Sem Drama Aguardarei" in 2006.
 Russian songs "Я её хой" by Professor Lebedinsky with Russkiy Razmer, and "Эй, ди-джей, водочки налей" by DJ Slon.
 German group ItaloBrothers released a cover of "Dragostea Din Tei" named "My Life Is a Party" in 2012.
 Dan Bălan recorded "Sugar Tunes", a pop rock song based on the melody of "Dragostea Din Tei", in 2006.
 Austrian child singer  performed a German cover of it on Kiddy Contest 2004 as "Unsichtbar" ("Invisible").
 Dutch comedian Ome Henk made a parody called "Lekker Lekker (Ga Maar Met Me Mee)" ("Tasty, Tasty, Now Come With Me"), which was quite popular at the time.
 Dan Bălan recorded a revised remixed version (with some amended lyrics) called "Numa Numa 2" in 2018. It includes vocals by Marley Waters in both Romanian and English, with newer Romanian vocals from Dan, while retaining the chorus from the original "Dragostea Din Tei". The music video was recorded in Uganda and features dancing by Ugandan kids and youth.
 There are two Czech versions: one, "Rumba rej", by Czech children's music singer Dáda Patrasová; and a second version, a parody called "Ruma dej" ("Give me a rum").
 German singer Leony's 2021 song "Faded Love" reprises the melody of the chorus.
 British group The Lathums have a version called "Numa Numa Yey".
 The Voice of Ukraine season 9 contestant Kateryna Begu performed the song with a slow arrangement on blind auditions, with Dan Bălan as one of the coaches. This performance resulted in four coaches turning their chairs, and after that, Bălan joined her on stage to perform a duet. As of July 2021, their video has been watched over 24.7 million times on YouTube.
 German metal group Feuerschwanz released a cover version of the song with an accompanying video in 2022.

Asia
 In Israel, the song was translated and used as a theme song for the children's show Festigal.
 Also in Israel, the music was used by the Na Nach subgroup of Breslover Hasidim, who follow the teachings of Rabbi Nachman of Breslov, according to the tradition of Rabbi Yisroel Ber Odesser (called the Saba, or grandfather, by the Na Nachs). The sect's song in praise of Rabbi Nachman, titled "Na Nach Nachma Nachman Meuman," uses the music from the song "Dragostea Din Tei" for one of its most well-known versions.
 An Indonesian version of this song was released by Indonesian group Barakatak with the title "Buka-Bukaan" (a euphemism that refers to, and can be roughly translated as, "(The Act of) Undressing") in 2005 and on YouTube in 2008. The lyrics contain adult content, while the title itself refers to sexual activity.
 There are also three versions sung in Mandarin: Singapore's Jocie Kok (郭美美) wrote "Bu Pa Bu Pa" (不怕不怕, "Not Afraid, Not Afraid"), Taiwan's 2moro wrote "Shabu Shabu", and Elva Hsiao (蕭亞軒) wrote "Lian Ai Feng" (戀愛瘋, "Crazy Love").
 In South Korea, Hyun Young, a South Korean model/actress/singer, released a Korean version of the song, titled "누나의 꿈" ("Nuna-ui Kkum"; "Sister's Dream"), which ranked among the top on various Korean charts in March 2006, within weeks from release.  The song preserves the "ma-ia-hii" and "nu mă, nu mă iei" choruses from the original; however, while the "ma-ia-hii" does not carry any meaning, but is merely used as a rhythmic interjection, the "nu mă iei" is approximated as "누나의" ("nuna-ui", often pronounced "nuna-e"), which means "elder sister's". "Noona" is also an affectionate title a South Korean man calls a woman who is older than he is. The lyrics of "Sister's Dream" are about a romance between a younger man and an older woman.
 In Japan, Gille sampled the "ma-ia-hii" chorus for her debut single "Girls".
 In Thailand, Yai RedBeat (Thai: ใหญ่ เรดบิท) used this music in his song "Oh-Jao-Nee" (In Thai: โอ้เจ้าหนี้; "Oh, creditor").
 A Japanese version of the song was released by comedian Maeda Ken on 24 August 2005, under the artist name Maeken Trance Project (his drag alter-ego), titled "Koi no Buchiage Tengoku: Koi no Maiahi~Chihuahua~Banzai "(恋のブチアゲ 天国：恋のマイアヒ～チワワ～バンザイ, "Love's High Tension Paradise: Love's Maiahi~Chihuahua~Hurrah"), fusing the original song with popular Japanese Eurobeat song "Banzai" and part of the 2002 ad Coca-Cola commercial-related hit by DJ BoBo, "Chihuahua". Although this is a Japanese release, the "Dragostea Din Tei" section of the medley is sung in Romanian.
 On 11 November 2005, another Japanese version under the same title "Koi no Maiahi" was released on the compilation album of Avex record label artists Girl's Box ~Best Hits Compilation Winter~ (AVCD-17769) by the singers Hasebe Yu (長谷部優) from girl group "dream", Iwasaki Mai (岩崎舞), and Takimoto Miori (瀧本美織) both from girl group "SweetS". The group also did a Nectar, Kamehama-honey, and Crystal remix of this song.
 In Vietnam, Đan Trường translated and covered this song into Vietnamese as "The Mai-Ya-Hee Song" (Vietnamese: "Bài ca Mai-Ya-Hee") in 2006, and Vũ Hà translated and covered this song into Vietnamese as "The Mai-Ya-Hee Lover" (Vietnamese: "Người Tình Mai-Ya-Hee") in 2007, although "Dragostea Din Tei" was popularized through pubs and bars in some cities.
 In 2021, Lazada Group uses this song's rhythm for their advertisement in Indonesian, Malay, Thai, and Vietnamese languages, namely Lazada 12.12.

See also
 List of best-selling singles in Japan
 List of Romanian Top 100 number ones of the 2000s

References

External links

 O-Zone official Japanese website 
 O-Zone official German website 

2003 singles
2003 songs
Dutch Top 40 number-one singles
European Hot 100 Singles number-one singles
Irish Singles Chart number-one singles
Jive Records singles
Macaronic songs
Number-one singles in Austria
Number-one singles in Denmark
Number-one singles in Germany
Number-one singles in Italy
Number-one singles in Norway
Number-one singles in Romania
Number-one singles in Spain
Number-one singles in Sweden
Number-one singles in Switzerland
O-Zone songs
Polydor Records singles
Romanian-language songs
SNEP Top Singles number-one singles
Songs containing the I–V-vi-IV progression
Songs written by Dan Balan
Ultra Records singles
Ultratop 50 Singles (Wallonia) number-one singles
Songs involved in plagiarism controversies